ORGANIZE is a US-based non-profit focused on bringing reform to the organ donation system.  ORGANIZE was co-founded by Jenna Arnold and Greg Segal in late 2013 after Segal's father, Rick Segal, was forced to wait five years to undergo a heart transplant. In 2015, ORGANIZE received an Innovator in Residence position in the Office of the US Secretary of Health and Human Services and was a featured presenter the 2016 White House Organ Donation Summit.

On May 14, 2017, ORGANIZE's living donor registry, www.giveandlive.us, was the featured call to action on the HBO series Last Week Tonight with John Oliver.

Awards and recognition
ORGANIZE has been profiled in the New York Times, Washington Post, Forbes, Slate, and Fast Company. ORGANIZE received the $1MM First Prize in the Verizon Powerful Answers Award, the Inaugural Stanford MedX Health Care Design Award, a Tribeca Disruptive Innovation Award, and the Classy Award as one of the top 10 social change organizations in the world. The New York Times called ORGANIZE one of 2016's "Biggest Ideas in Social Change", and ORGANIZE's co-founders have been honored in Inc Magazine's "35 Under 35 List" and Oprah's list of 100 Super Soul Influencers.

At the 2016 White House Organ Donation Summit, ORGANIZE announced partnerships to promote organ donation with Facebook, Twitter, Instagram, Funny or Die, and the White House Social and Behavioral Sciences Team, among others.

On August 14, 2015, ORGANIZE was honored during the pre-game ceremony at Fenway Park for a baseball game between the Boston Red Sox and the Seattle Mariners, and co-founder Greg Segal's father, a heart transplant recipient, threw out the game's Ceremonial First Pitch.

References

Organizations established in 2013
Health charities in the United States
Transplant organizations
Organ donation
Charities based in New York (state)
Medical and health organizations based in New York (state)